First a Girl is a 1935 British comedy film directed by Victor Saville and starring Jessie Matthews. First a Girl was adapted from the 1933 German film Viktor und Viktoria written and directed by Reinhold Schünzel. It was remade as the 1982 American musical comedy Victor Victoria starring Julie Andrews.

Plot
Fashion designer Madame Seraphina stages an elaborate catwalk show for a specially invited audience, including Princess Miranoff. Watching the fashion parade are the designer's shop girls, including Elizabeth (Jessie Matthews), who dances for the amusement of her colleagues and impersonates the Princess. Madame Seraphina asks Elizabeth to deliver some purchases to Princess Miranoff but she is distracted on the way by a theatrical audition. Despite borrowing Princess Miranoff's glamorous clothes, she does not get a part. It is pouring with rain as she leaves the theatre and her borrowed clothes get drenched. Going into a café to dry off she finds herself sitting opposite an actor called Victor, (Sonnie Hale) whom she met earlier at the audition. He confides in her that although he performs in drag as music hall act 'Victoria', he dreams of being a Shakespearean actor. Elizabeth begins to cry when she realises that she will probably lose her job after failing to deliver Princess Miranoff's purchases. Victor takes her back to his boarding house and she irons the dress to make it look as if it hasn't been worn. Victor receives a letter asking him to perform his drag act but he has lost his voice due to being caught in the rain. As Elizabeth consoles him she realises that she has forgotten the iron - it has burned a hole in Princess Miranoff's dress. Elizabeth begins to laugh at their misfortune and Victor has a brainwave: Elizabeth could stand in for him and pose as a female impersonator.

Elizabeth's first music hall performance is a great success, despite runaway geese storming the stage and spilt milk causing her to slip over several times. Music hall promoter McLintock comes backstage and offers Elizabeth a contract. Elizabeth begins touring Europe as female impersonator 'Bill' using Victor's stage name 'Victoria'. Princess Miranoff and her fiancé Robert attend one of 'Bill's' performances. Robert makes it clear that he is attracted to the woman on stage and when she takes off her wig to reveal boyishly cropped hair he is shocked and embarrassed. At a nightclub after the show Victor attempts to charm Princess Miranoff with Shakespeare recitations as Robert has a manly chat with 'Bill'. Elizabeth is forced to smoke a cigar and drink large whiskeys as she attempts to maintain the pretence that she is a man. When Princess Miranoff finds a feminine hair comb under a chair she begins to suspect that 'Bill' is indeed a woman. She and Robert invite their new friends to travel with them to the South of France with the intention of tricking 'Bill' into revealing his true gender. The three 'men' are forced to share a room in a guesthouse for a night but Elizabeth manages to maintain her disguise.

At the villa she has rented with Victor, Elizabeth revels in the chance to wear women's clothes again. Swimming in the sea, she gets into trouble when Robert surprises her by turning up; he has to use lifesaving techniques to get her back to shore. In a tight fitting swimsuit there is no doubt that she is a woman and Robert is tempted to kiss her but he apologises, turns and swims away.

Tired of pretending to be a man, Elizabeth tells the Princess she is in love with Robert and will fight for him. The Princess vows to expose Elizabeth as a fraud. Robert, believing that Victor and Elizabeth are lovers, punches Victor and spurns Elizabeth when she approaches him dressed in her own, feminine clothes. When Victor explains that they are just good friends, Robert chases Elizabeth in his car so that he can express his love for her. They kiss but Elizabeth has to cut their romantic interlude short in order to drive to the theatre for a performance. A newspaper reporter who has caught a glimpse of Elizabeth in women's clothing arrives at the theatre with two Gendarmes in order to expose her deception. Victor saves the day by performing 'Everything's in Rhythm With My Heart' in drag to amusing effect. Princess Miranoff pledges to fund Victor in Shakespearean theatre and despite Elizabeth having a man's passport, she is waved across the French border to begin her new life with Robert.

Cast

 Jessie Matthews as Elizabeth
 Sonnie Hale as Victor
 Anna Lee as Princess Mironoff
 Griffith Jones as Robert
 Alfred Drayton as Mr. McLintock
 Constance Godridge as Beryl
 Eddie Gray as Goose Trainer
 Martita Hunt as Madame Seraphina
 Donald Stewart as Singer

Critical reception
BFI Screenonline wrote, "Of all the Matthews/Hale collaborations, this one seems the most polished and even-handed. A huge success at the time it was released, First a Girl is possibly the quintessential Jessie Matthews musical and certainly the most enduringly amusing for a modern audience."

References

External links

1935 films
1935 musical comedy films
British musical comedy films
British black-and-white films
Cross-dressing in film
Films directed by Victor Saville
Films produced by Michael Balcon
British remakes of German films
Films set in London
Films set in France
1930s English-language films
1930s British films